Johnny Duane (born 18 October 1991) is an Irish Gaelic football player from Galway. Duane plays club football for St James' and inter-county football for Galway.

Duane was a key part of Galway's All-Ireland Under-21 Football Championship win in 2011.

He made his senior debut in 2011 against Mayo in a Connacht semi-final, which Galway lost thus sending them to the qualifiers.

Honours
Galway
Connacht Under-21 Football Championship (1): 2011
All-Ireland Under-21 Football Championship (1): 2011
Connacht Senior Football Championship (1): 2018

References

1991 births
Living people
Galway inter-county Gaelic footballers
New York inter-county Gaelic footballers
St James' (Galway) Gaelic footballers